Entertainment Ki Raat is an Indian reality TV show on Colors TV. It was produced by Optimystix Entertainment India pvt. ltd and starred Ravi Dubey, Aditya Narayan, Dipika Kakkar Ibrahim, Malishka RJ, Balraj Sayal, Asha Negi, Divyansh Dwivedi, Keyan, Kavya, Raghu Ram. Season 1 aired from 18 November 2017 to 17 February 2018. Season 2 aired from 21 April 2018 to 27 May 2018.

Cast of Season 1

Main
 Ravi Dubey
 Asha Negi
 Raghu Ram
 Dipika Kakkar Ibrahim
 Malishka RJ
 Balraj Syal
 Mubeen Saudagar
 Karan Wahi
 Aditya Narayan
 Neha Pendse
 Divyansh Dwivedi
 Keyan
 Kavya

Guest Appearances
 Jigyasa Singh only to replace Dipika Kakar

Cast of Season 2

Main
Mubeen Saudagar
Saumya Tandon
Balraj Sayal
Divyansh Dwivedi
Abhilash Thapliyal
Neha Pendse
Rubina Dilaik
Karan Patel
Karan Wahi
Drashti Dhami
Kavita Kaushik
Shraddha Arya
Hina Khan
Vivian Dsena
Shantanu Maheshwari
Deepika Singh Goyal
Karan Tacker
Aly Goni

Description
Entertainment Ki Raat is latest reality TV show by Colors TV. Entertainment Ki Raat show has all kinds of entertaining segments including stand-up comedy, musical rapping, drop the mic, celebrity chat segment and many more, the show will prove to be an entertainment variety show.

Rap battle
Drop the Mic is a part of the show hosted by Aditya Narayan, where two celebrity guests have to do a face-off by belittling each other sarcastically. They are to do so in the form of a rap. The first one to drop their mic will be declared the loser.

Episodes

Season 1

Season 2

References

Colors TV original programming
Indian drama television series
2017 Indian television series debuts
Television series by Optimystix Entertainment